The Pyramid of the Sun God (German: Die Pyramide des Sonnengottes is a 1965 West German and Italian western film adventure directed by Robert Siodmak and starring Lex Barker, Gérard Barray and Michèle Girardon. It is based on a book by Karl May, and was part of a boom of Karl May adaptations during the decade. It follows on from The Treasure of the Aztecs (1965), also directed by Siodmak and featuring the same cast.

It was shot at the Spandau Studios in Berlin. The film's sets were designed by the art directors Veljko Despotovic and Hertha Hareiter and Otto Pischinger. Rio Grande

Cast
Lex Barker as Dr. Karl Sternau
Michèle Girardon as Josefa Cortejo
Gérard Barray as Count Alfonso di Rodriganda y Sevilla
Hans Nielsen as Don Pedro Arbellez
Rik Battaglia as Captain Lazaro Verdoja
Gustavo Rojo as Lieutenant Potoca
Theresa Lorca as Karja
Ralf Wolter as Andreas Hasenpfeffer
Kelo Henderson as Frank Wilson
Alessandra Panaro as Rosita Arbellez
Jean-Roger Caussimon as Marshall Bazaine
Antun Nalis as Pablo Cortejo
Vladimir Popovic as Black Deer
Branimir Tori Jankovic as Panteo
Nada Radovic as Big India Rio Grande film

See also
 The Treasure of the Aztecs (1965)
 Karl May films

References

Bibliography 
 Bergfelder, Tim. International Adventures: German Popular Cinema and European Co-Productions in the 1960s. Berghahn Books, 2005.

External links
 

1965 films
1965 Western (genre) films
German Western (genre) films
West German films
Films based on works by Karl May
Films directed by Robert Siodmak
Second French intervention in Mexico films
1960s historical adventure films
German historical adventure films
French historical adventure films
Italian historical adventure films
Gloria Film films
Films set in 1864
Films set in Mexico
Films shot at Spandau Studios
1960s German-language films
1960s Italian films
1960s French films
1960s German films